Knights of the Cross may refer to:
Knights of the Cross with the Red Star, whose insignia is a red Maltese cross on a black background
Teutonic Knights, whose insignia is a black cross on a white background
an alternate title of Henryk Sienkiewicz's novel The Teutonic Knights
Knights of the Cross (album), by Grave Digger
the "Knights of the Cross" are a group of Knights in "The Dresden Files"
Knights of the Cross, a 2002 Polish video game